Silpium Mons is a mountain on Jupiter's moon Io. It is 5.6 kilometers in height, 113 kilometers in length, and 79.7 kilometers in width. It covers an area of 7073 km2. It is a striated ridge, meaning it is an elevated structure dominated by one or more prominent linear or arcuate rises. It is named after a location in Greece where the mythological Io died of grief. Its name was adopted by the International Astronomical Union in 1979. Its proximity to Svarog and Viracocha Paterae has been suggested to be evidence for a structural relationship between mountains and calderas on Io.

References

Mountains on Io (moon)